Class 220 may refer to:

British Rail Class 220
DB Class V 200, 220 class from 1968